Rally Isle of Man (previously the Manx International Rally and formerly the Manx Trophy Rally) is a car rally competition held in the Isle of Man. It was first held in 1963, and later became a well-known event in the British Open Rally Championship and the European Rally Championship (until 1996). In 2002, it became part of the Irish Tarmac Rally Championship in addition to the British Rally Championship. The most successful drivers in the history of the rally include the five-time winner Mark Higgins and the four-time winners Tony Pond and Russell Brookes.

This has been an annual event for many years, apart from cancellation in 2011. In early September 2018, it was announced that the 2018 event had been cancelled. Various allegations were made, blaming the cancellation on, inter alia, the rally organisers, the Department of Infrastructure and the Department for Enterprise. The event returned in 2022 as part of the FIA Celtic Rally Trophy.

Stage locations 
Rally Isle of Man is run on public roads closed for racing by the provisions of an Act of Tynwald (the parliament of the Isle of Man). The event has special timed stages that use narrow farm-lanes with high grass banks, stages over open moorland and Monaco-style 'around-the-houses' stages in Ramsey or Castletown. The exact routes vary each year, but in 2008 the longest timed special stage was the 21.46 mile Milerisk stage and the shortest included the 1.46 mile Balley Cashtal stage in Castletown and the 0.90 mile Villa Marina "super-special" stage in Douglas.

Special stage records 
Records and stage times for competition sections for the Manx International Rally and Rally Isle of Man.

Winners

Multiple winners

References

External links 
 Official website

Rally competitions in the United Kingdom
Motorsport in the Isle of Man
Autumn events in the Isle of Man